The ACB contests are the 3-point shootout and slam dunk contests held by the Liga ACB, the top-tier level professional club basketball league in the country of Spain.

History
From 1986 through 2003, these contests were celebrated during the ACB League's weekend festival, which was called Showtime ACB, and which included the Liga ACB Stars Match (Spanish All-Star Game). From 1992 to 1994, this weekend was organized by ULEB. In 1992 and 1993, it was contested between the Spanish ACB League's all-stars and the Italian League's all-stars. While the French League's all-stars also joined in the contest in the 1994. After the 2003, the ACB decided not to organize the All-Star Game anymore.

Since 2004, the Liga ACB's slam dunk and 3 point shootout contests are played during the Spanish Supercup, with the exception of 2011, when they weren't organized, and 2012, when it was celebrated during the presentation of the league, in the headquarters of Endesa, the league's main sponsor.

Liga ACB Stars Match

The Liga ACB's all-star game, which was called the Stars Match, was first held in 1986, and was last held in 2003.

Three-Point Shootout

The Liga ACB's three-point shootout began in 1988. It has the same format as the NBA's three-point shootout. For the 2009 and 2011 editions, there was the possibility of a magic three-pointer from 8-meters distance (26 feet 3 inches), which was worth four points.

In some editions, a female player from the Spanish Women's League was invited. For the 2013 and 2014 contests, three-point shooting record-man Josh Ruggles, was invited.

Slam Dunk Contest

The Liga ACB's Slam Dunk Contest was first held in 1986, and was last held in 2012.

ULEB All-Star Game rosters (1992–1994)
1st ULEB All-Star Game 1992–93
Palacio de los Deportes, Madrid, November 14, 1992: Liga ACB All-Stars - Lega Basket All-Stars 136–123  
Liga ACB All-Stars FIAT (Miguel Ángel Martín Fernández, Lolo Sainz): Joe Arlauckas, Tim Burroughs, Darryl Middleton, Velimir Perasović, Harold Pressley, Kevin Pritchard, Arvydas Sabonis, Zoran Savic, Reggie Slater, Chandler Thompson, Andre Turner, Rickie Winslow.
Lega Basket All-Stars POLTI (Alberto Bucci, Ettore Messina): Greg Cadillac Anderson, Predrag Danilovic, Darryl Dawkins, Darren Daye, Aleksandar Đorđević, A.J. English, Pace Mannion, Oscar Schmidt, Dino Radja, Terry Teagle, Alexander Volkov, Haywoode Workman.

2nd ULEB All-Star Game 1993–94
PalaEur, Rome, November 13, 1993: Lega Basket All-Stars - Liga ACB All-Stars 135–131  
Liga ACB All-Stars (Clifford Luyk, José Alberto Pesquera): Michael Anderson, Joe Arlauckas, Roy Fisher, Dan Godfread, Dennis Hopson, Tony Massenburg, Darryl Middleton, Ivo Nakic, Oscar Schmidt, Fred Roberts, Andy Toolson, Andre Turner.
Lega Basket All-Stars POLTI (Alberto Bucci, Fabrizio Frates): Joe Binion, Dejan Bodiroga, Predrag Danilovic, Aleksandar Đorđević, Winston Garland, Dean Garrett, Dan Gay, Shelton Jones, Cliff Levingston, George McCloud, Micheal Ray Richardson, Henry Williams.

3d ULEB All-Star Game 1994–95
Pavelló Municipal Font de Sant Lluís, Valencia, November 14, 1994: Lega Basket All-Stars - LNB All-Stars 58–54  
Pavelló Municipal Font de Sant Lluís, Valencia, November 14, 1994: Liga ACB All-Stars - LNB All-Stars 59–43  
Pavelló Municipal Font de Sant Lluís, Valencia, November 14, 1994: Lega Basket All-Stars - Liga ACB All-Stars 53–48  
Lega Basket All-Stars (Alberto Bucci, Bogdan Tanjevic): Wendell Alexis, Joe Binion, Dejan Bodiroga, Dallas Comegys, Emanual Davis, Aleksandar Đorđević, Dan Gay, Gerald Glass, Billy McCaffrey, Petar Naumoski, Jeff Sanders, John Turner.
Liga ACB All-Stars (Aíto García Reneses, Manu Moreno): Darrell Armstrong, Michael Curry, Roy Fisher, Dan Godfread, Kenny Green, Warren Kidd, Darryl Middleton, Oscar Schmidt, Corny Thompson, Andy Toolson, Andre Turner.
LNB All-Stars (Božidar Maljković, Jacques Monclar): Ron Anderson, Winston Crite, Ron Curry, Tim Kempton, Conrad McRae, David Rivers, Michael Ray Richardson, Delaney Rudd, Rickie Winslow, Michael Young.

Players with most appearances (1986-2003)

See also
Liga ACB Presentation Games

References

External links
Liga ACB official website 
Liga ACB Historia del All Star 

Contests
Basketball all-star games